Žiga Donik (born 21 September 1995) is a Slovenian volleyball player who plays for Merkur Maribor. With the Slovenian national team, he competed in the 2016 FIVB Volleyball World League.

References 

1995 births
Living people
Sportspeople from Maribor
Slovenian men's volleyball players
21st-century Slovenian people